David Atkins, OAM (born 12 December 1955) is an Australian dancer, choreographer, music-theatre director and producer.

Career

Stage and television
Atkins began his performance career aged 12 with a role in the musical Mame.  As an adult performer, as well as performing in shows such as A Chorus Line and The Pirates of Penzance, he created and performed in his own works Dancin' Man and Dynamite.

World events
Atkins has directed and produced major live events in various countries. These include Victory Ceremonies in Vancouver, British Columbia, Canada.

Honours and awards
Atkins was recognised in the 2003 Queen's Birthday Honours with a Medal of the Order of Australia (OAM) for his contribution to the Australian entertainment industry. 
In 2010, the Australian Event Awards presented him with a Lifetime Achievement Award for his enduring contributions to the Australian events industry.

Mo Awards
The Australian Entertainment Mo Awards (commonly known informally as the Mo Awards), were annual Australian entertainment industry awards. They recognise achievements in live entertainment in Australia from 1975 to 2016. David Atkins won nine awards in that time.
 (wins only)
|-
| 1991
| David Atkins
| Outstanding Contribution to Musical Theatre
| 
|-
|rowspan="2"| 1992
| David Atkins
| Musical Theatre Male Performer of the Year
| 
|-
| David Atkins
| Musical Theatre Performer of the Year
| 
|-
|rowspan="2"| 1994
| David Atkins
| Musical Theatre Male Performer of the Year
| 
|-
| David Atkins
| Australian Showbusiness Ambassador
| 
|-
|rowspan="2"| 1995
| David Atkins
| Outstanding Contribution to Musical Theatre
| 
|-
| David Atkins
| Australian Showbusiness Ambassador
| 
|-
| 1997
| David Atkins
| Outstanding Contribution to Musical Theatre
| 
|-
| 1998
| David Atkins
| Outstanding Contribution to Musical Theatre
| 
|-

References

External links
 David Atkins Enterprises official website

1955 births
Living people
Australian male stage actors
Australian male film actors
Australian male dancers
Australian male musical theatre actors
Australian theatre directors
Helpmann Award winners
Laurence Olivier Award winners
Recipients of the Medal of the Order of Australia
Australian theatre managers and producers